José Benítez (c. 1760 – 1832) was mayor of Ponce, Puerto Rico in 1800. He is best remembered for the creation of the Fuerte de San José in 1760 in Playa de Ponce. The fort was in operation until the 1890s.

Background
Benítez is best remembered as the military commander who led a group of urban militiamen from Ponce in their defense of San Juan during the British invasion of 1797.

Family life
Benítez married Juana Constanza Batista Rodríguez, and was the father of María Bibiana Benítez, considered the first Puerto Rican female poet.

Mayoral term
As a result of an attempted attack by the English navy, in 1802 Benítez established a shoreline lookout, and set up an artillery battery at El Peñoncillo in Barrio Playa, Ponce, to prevent further attempts by the English from dropping anchor and staging an attack from that area.  On 1800, Benítez reported that the municipality of Ponce (then called "Partido de Ponce") measured 200 "caballerías", that is, . He categorized the jurisdiction into cotos, hatos, criaderos, monterías, and terrenos realengos. Cotos were lands awarded to residents as reward for their services to the king. They were developed into estancias or lands apt to be cultivated for agricultural use. Hatos were lands not granted to anyone in particular, but available for communal use where cattle could roam at will. Monterías were hilly areas located next to hatos were cattle could be reigned in or gathered together with the help of trained dogs.  Criaderos were lands were cows could be herded for milk production. Goats, sheep, pigs, asses, and mares were also herded in criaderos.  Terrenos realengos were lands that belonged to the state (to the king).

Controversies
In 1805, Benítez was accused of financial improprieties by a political rival and although a criminal investigation led nowhere, by 1825 the accusations were enough to reduce the war hero to a customs agent in Guayama. After his death in 1832, his family's fortunes were further diminished, but his daughter was able to successfully petition the government for a land grant, which kept them from becoming insolvent.

Legacy
In Ponce, there is a street in Urbanización Las Delicias of Barrio Magueyes named after him.

See also

List of Puerto Ricans
List of mayors of Ponce, Puerto Rico

Notes

References

Further reading
 Fay Fowlie de Flores. Ponce, Perla del Sur: Una Bibliográfica Anotada. Second Edition. 1997. Ponce, Puerto Rico: Universidad de Puerto Rico en Ponce. p. 210. Item 1078. 
 Juan Jose Barragán Landa. Los Benitez: raíces de una familia hacedora de historia. Rio Piedras: Puerto Rico. 1996. (Colegio Universitario Tecnológico de Ponce, CUTPO).

1760s births
1832 deaths
Mayors of Ponce, Puerto Rico
Year of birth uncertain